Advocate K. Somaprasad was a Rajyasabha member from Kerala. He was the President of Kollam district panchayat  and is a member of CPI(M) unit of Kerala.
He was CPI(M) candidate for the Rajya Sabha elections for Kerala state held in March 2016.

Rajya Sabha member
Parliamentary Committee assignments 
 13 Sept. 2021 onwards: Member Committee on External Affairs

References

Year of birth missing (living people)
Living people
Communist Party of India (Marxist) politicians from Kerala
Politicians from Kollam
Rajya Sabha members from Kerala
21st-century Indian politicians